Demirci is a town and district of Manisa Province, Turkey.

Demirci (Turkish: "blacksmith") may refer to:

People
 Demirci (surname)
 Demirdjian (surname)

Places
 Demirci, Ayvacık
 Demirci, Çubuk, a village in the district of Çubuk, Ankara Province, Turkey
 Demirci, Gülağaç, a village in the district of Gülağaç, Aksaray Province, Turkey
 Demirci, Hınıs
 Demirci, Kovancılar
 Demirci, Kurucaşile, a village in the district of Kurucaşile, Bartın Province, Turkey
 Demirci, Nilüfer
 Demirci, Orhaneli
 Demirci, Şavşat, a village in the district of Şavşat, Artvin Province, Turkey

See also
 Dəmirçi (disambiguation)
 Demirciler (disambiguation)
 Dəmirçilər (disambiguation)